Lataroa is an uninhabited island in Sanma Province of Vanuatu in the Pacific Ocean.

International company Singraphus in co-operation with Radisson Hotel Group has announced the development of a large resort – Radisson Lataroa Island.

Geography
Lataro lies in Shark Bay, a few kilometers off the eastern coast of Espiritu Santo. Lataroa has a clean, white sand beach with fringing reef on the western side.

References

Islands of Vanuatu
Sanma Province
Uninhabited islands of Vanuatu